Krier is a surname. Notable people with the surname include:

 Andrew W. K., musician
 Antoine Krier, Luxembourg politician
 Cyndi Taylor Krier, Texas politician
 Herman Krier, American engineer
 Jacques Krier (1926-2008), French television producer and director, novelist
 James E. Krier, American legal scholar
 Léon Krier, Luxembourg architect, city planner and author; brother of Rob 
 Rob Krier, Luxembourg architect, city planner and author; brother of Léon
 Tony Krier, Luxembourg photographer

Surnames of Luxembourgian origin
German-language surnames